Boston is a former neighborhood of Louisville, Kentucky located along Shelbyville Road (US 60) near Long Run. It is now surrounded by subdivisions and the designation is no longer used.

References
  

Neighborhoods in Louisville, Kentucky